Sectarian democracies are  multifactional countries where the faction with the greatest power has a democratic government that is discriminatory towards the other faction.

Present-day Iraq
Present day Iraq is a sectarian democracy where the Shiite controls the majority of the government. This is partly because Shiites in Iraq are the dominant religious group and partly because many Sunnis boycotted the elections. Despite the sectionality of the government it must be remembered that there are elected Sunnis and Kurds in power.

Apartheid South Africa
Under apartheid, South Africa was a sectarian democracy which some called a "white-only democracy". White South Africans enjoyed the right to vote and to participate in the political process whereas the Black South Africans were oppressed. The end of apartheid brought about consociationalist-like  government allowing for powersharing between Black and White South Africans.

Northern Ireland
The political power was concentrated in the hands of the Protestant Unionists and this led to sectarian violence until the establishment of a consociationalist-like government which allowed powersharing between the Protestant Unionists and the Catholic Nationalists.

References

Democracy
Types of democracy